Second Home is Marié Digby's second album and first Japanese studio album, released on March 4, 2009.

Track list

Marié Digby albums
2009 albums